Fidel Ortiz Tovar, also known as Fidelón (10 October 1908 – 9 September 1975) was a Mexican boxer who represented his country in the 1928 and 1936 Summer Olympics. In the later competition, he defeated Swedish pugilist Stig Cederberg to win the bronze medal in the Bantamweight class.

Amateur career
In Amsterdam 1928, he lost his first fight in the bantamweight competition and was eliminated. Eight years later, he won the bronze medal in the bantamweight class after winning the third place fight against Stig Cederberg.

1928 Olympic results
Below is the record of Fidel Ortiz, a Mexican bantamweight boxer who competed at the 1928 Amsterdam Olympics:

 Round of 32: bye
 Round of 16: lost to Vittorio Tamagnini (Italy) on points

1936 Olympic results
Below are the results of Fidel Ortiz, a Mexican bantamweight boxer, who competed at the 1936 Berlin Olympics:

 Round of 32: defeated Herve Lacelles (Canada) on points
 Round of 16: defeated Albert Barnes (Great Britain) on points
 Quarterfinal: defeated Alec Hannan (South Africa) on points
 Semifinal: lost to Jack Wilson (United States) on points
 Bronze Medal bout: defeated Stig Cederberg (Sweden) on points (won bronze medal)

References

Boxers from Mexico City
Bantamweight boxers
Olympic boxers of Mexico
Boxers at the 1928 Summer Olympics
Boxers at the 1936 Summer Olympics
Olympic bronze medalists for Mexico
Olympic medalists in boxing
Medalists at the 1936 Summer Olympics
1908 births
1975 deaths
Mexican male boxers